The Črnivec Pass, usually just Črnivec, is a mountain pass in the Kamnik Alps that connects the traditional regions of Upper Carniola and Styria in Slovenia.

It lies on the drainage divide between the Kamnik Bistrica and Dreta rivers. The road connecting Kamnik and Gornji Grad traverses the pass.

External links
Črnivec at Geopedia

Mountain passes of Slovenia